Maran Galu (also Romanized as Mārān Galū; also known as Mārān, Mārān Galūyeh, and Mūrūn) is a village in Halil Rural District, in the Central District of Jiroft County, Kerman Province, Iran. At the 2006 census, its population was 72, in 16 families.

References 

Populated places in Jiroft County